Isidore Williem Schlesinger (Bowery, New York City, 15 September 1871 – Johannesburg, 1 March 1949) was a business tycoon and pioneer of the South African Entertainment industry. At 1.58 metres tall, he was nicknamed "Little Man", and was a significant figure in the South African Business world with interests in numerous economic sectors.

Background and youth 
Schlesinger was the second son of 10 children of Abraham Schlesinger, a Hungarian Jewish immigrant. The European branch of the family owned a sawmill in the Tatra Mountains (part of the Carpathian Mountains) on the border of what would later be Czechoslovakia. Since the mill could not support the entire family, two brothers, Abraham and Moritz, emigrated to the United States of America. They began to work there as woodcutters. Abraham went on to found a cigar factory and later a bank.

Schlesinger spent his childhood on the outskirts of the Bowery, on the East Side of New York City, where as a boy, he helped the family make an income by forging hair clips and selling newspapers. At the age of eighteen, he became a commissioner and insurance salesman.

Coming to South Africa 
After Schlesinger read of the discovery of gold in the Witwatersrand, he traveled to South Africa in 1894 against his family's wishes. In Johannesburg, he at first worked as a traveling salesman of American goods, but began working for the Equitable Insurance Company when he realized it would be more profitable, and became a highly successful insurance agent, exceeding all records in the field. Over the course of two years, Schlesinger prospered, earning £1,000 in commission selling policies on journeys throughout South Africa and German South West Africa. He thereby gained a detailed knowledge of the land and its people, and his clients included the chiefs of Swaziland.

Insurer, property developer, and financier 
According to one source, Schlesinger was appointed regional manager by Equitable in Ireland on the eve of the Second Boer War. According to another source, he was still an American citizen during the war and enjoyed considerable freedom as such, until the disruption to commerce led him to return to America, from there moving on to Ireland to sell the same insurance. After the war, in any case, he returned to Johannesburg to launch a property development firm, the African Realty Trust. Until 1904, the Trust developed new neighborhoods in Port Elizabeth (Mount Pleasant) and Johannesburg (Orange Grove, Houghton, and Killarney) where salary-earners were given the opportunity to mortgage homes, a first in South Africa.

At the end of 1904, he founded his first Insurance company, the African Life Assurance Society, with the £20,000 he had earned from the development of the suburb of Parkhurst. During its first year in business, the company sold 2,274 policies worth £1 million, a record for a new business in the industry at the time. As managing director, he organized the entire company from the boardroom to the stationery box and personally coached all recruiters and agents.

In 1905, he bought the financially struggling Robinson South African Bank (founded by J.B. Robinson) and converted it into the Colonial Banking and Trust Company, which specialized in small business loans. In 1911, he founded the African Guarantee and Indemnity Corporation to provide all types of insurance.

Entertainment industry 
In 1913, Schlesinger for the first time entered the entertainment industry with the purchase of the Empire Theatre in Johannesburg for £60,000, at a time when such businesses were loss leaders. He converted the insolvent business into a flourishing business named African Consolidated Theatres, which provided a central organization for the national distribution of movies and variety shows from the Cape of Good Hope to the Zambezi River. Another business he founded was African Film Productions, whose weekly "African Mirror" was the first South African newsreel. It was the first South African film studio.

In the 1920s, Schlesinger helped found South Africa's first radio stations when he took over the struggling national broadcasting service, which at the time had only 20,000 license holders. The African Broadcasting Company (ABC) he founded in 1930 had 125,000 licence holders by the time it was nationalized as the South African Broadcasting Corporation.

Farming operations 
Schlesinger had worked for commercial farm companies and founded several large pineapple plantations at Langholm near Grahamstown, leading him to found a cannery in Port Elizabeth for the product, named the African Canning and Packing Corporation. Thus began the pineapple industry in the eastern provinces. In Kendrew, near Graaff-Reinet, he began intensively irrigated citrus production, but catchment problems doomed the project. Later, in Zebediela, North Transvaal (Limpopo), he founded the largest single citrus plantation in the world, 650,000 trees were planted. Schlesinger also owned 80,000 merino sheep.

Business magnate 
In the early 1930s, by virtue of the success of his insurance firms, Schlesinger owned a large network of cinemas and theaters. He owned controlling interests in retailers, banks, advertising agencies, a hotel chain, Catering firms, theme parks, agriculture, canneries, diamond grinders, and newspapers, and was the chairman of more than 80 companies. His effort to found a large trust, however, failed afterwards; so did his entry into the Johannesburg newspaper market with the Sunday Express and his news service, Africopa. The competition from established outlets such as The Star and The Rand Daily Mail, and the South African Press Association (SAPA), respectively, was too strong, but his advertising agency was one of the largest in the region. Schlesinger sold off his remaining newspaper interests in 1939, parts of the Sunday Express going to Rand Daily Mails Ltd. (£44,047), The Sunday Times Syndicate Ltd. (£49,286), and the Argus Printing and Publishing Company Ltd. (£206,667). The Sunday Express published until 1939, when paper shortages during World War II halted it. It would not resume publication until September 1945. Schlesinger also started the Daily Express in Johannesburg and the Daily Tribune and Sunday Tribune in Durban. Of these four papers, only the Sunday Tribune continues today.

Appraisal 
Dr. M. Arkin described Schlesinger in the Suid-Afrikaanse Biografiese Woordeboek as "a short, sturdily built man, ...always dressed impeccably, [who] devoured all kinds of reading material. 'I.W.', as his colleagues and staff called him, was someone with great [physical] energy who worked long hours, especially when it came to businesses which served as a touchstone for his salesmanship and economic acumen. He enjoyed launching new businesses with plans to the finest detail, and exercised control over practically all of his companies. He conveyed his authority to others, however, with the utmost reluctance."

Personal life and death 
Schlesinger married Mable May, at the time a well-known actress in Johannesburg. Their only son, John Samuel Schlesinger (born in 1923), was educated at Michaelhouse, Natal, and graduated from Harvard University. With the death of his father in 1949, he took over the enormous Schlesinger organization.

During his last years, I.W. Schlesinger badly afflicted by arthritis. He continued to be actively involved in his businesses, however, remaining as chairman of dozens of companies. Though proud of his second homeland, he never gave up his American citizenship. He is buried in Zebediela.

References

Sources 
 (af) Arkin, Dr. M. and De Kock, W.J. (chief ed. until 1970) and Krüger, Prof. D.W. (chief ed. from 1971). 1972. Suid-Afrikaanse Biografiese Woordeboek, vol. II. Pretoria: Raad vir Geesteswetenskaplike Navorsing.
 (en) Joyce, Peter. 1989. The South African Family Encyclopaedia. Cape Town: Struik Publishers (pty) Ltd.
 (en) Rosenthal, Eric in Potgieter, D.J. (ed.) 1973. Standard Encyclopaedia of Southern Africa, vol. 9. Cape Town: Nasionale Opvoedkundige Uitgewery (Nasou).

South African businesspeople
South African Jews
1871 births
1949 deaths